Northtown Mall may refer to:
North Town Centre, formerly North Town Mall, Edmonton, Alberta, Canada
Northtown Mall (Blaine, Minnesota), U.S.
North Towne Square Mall, now Lakeside Centre, in Toledo, Ohio, U.S.
NorthTown Mall (Spokane, Washington), U.S.